Swami Pranavananda Homoeopathic Medical College and Hospital is a homeopathic medical college. It is founded in 1967 offering degrees in Homeopathy. It is located in Chhatarpur, Madhya Pradesh. It is affiliated to Madhya Pradesh Medical Science University, Jabalpur and recognised by the Central Council of Homeopathy, New Delhi.

References

External links
 

Homeopathic colleges
Universities and colleges in Madhya Pradesh
Medical colleges in Madhya Pradesh
Universities and colleges affiliated with the Bharat Sevashram Sangha